Graeme Paul Wheeler  (born 30 October 1951) is a former Governor of the Reserve Bank of New Zealand from 2012 to September 2017. He succeeded Alan Bollard in this role on 26 September 2012 and was succeeded by Grant Spencer.

Professional career

Educated at the University of Auckland, Wheeler began working at the New Zealand Treasury in 1973 as an adviser. From 1984 to 1990 he was economic and financial councillor for the New Zealand delegation to the Organisation for Economic Co-operation and Development, eventually becoming director of macroeconomic policy at the New Zealand Treasury in 1990. In 1997, he went to work for the World Bank Group, firstly as director of the Financial Products and Services Department. From 2001 to 2006 he was Treasurer and Vice-President of the World Bank. From 2006 to 2010 he was managing director of operations at the World Bank overseeing 12,000 staff and a US$1.7 billion budget. In 2010, Wheeler left the World Bank to start his own firm, advising investors and Russian policy makers about Russian privatisation. Wheeler currently serves as a company director in Europe and China.

Reserve Bank Governor

Wheeler succeeded Alan Bollard as Governor of the Reserve Bank of New Zealand on 26 September 2012. Wheeler was replaced by Deputy Governor Grant Spencer on 27 September 2017. In the 2018 New Year Honours, Wheeler was appointed Companion of the New Zealand Order of Merit for services to the state.

Cricketing career

A right-hand batsman and right-arm medium-pace bowler, Wheeler played one first-class match for Wellington in the 1981–82 season and two List A games where he topped the New Zealand bowling averages.

See also
Everything bubble
Fed put

References

1951 births
Living people
People from Hamilton, New Zealand
Companions of the New Zealand Order of Merit
University of Auckland alumni
Governors of the Reserve Bank of New Zealand
New Zealand cricketers
Wellington cricketers